Brevisiana is a genus of true bugs belonging to the family Cicadidae.

The species of this genus are found in Southern Africa.

Species:

Brevisiana brevis 
Brevisiana niveonotata 
Brevisiana quartaui

References

Cicadidae